After the Fall, originally titled Things People Do, is a 2014 American drama film directed by Saar Klein and starring Wes Bentley, Jason Issacs, and Vinessa Shaw. The film had its premiere in the Panorama section of the 64th Berlin International Film Festival. The film had its premiere in theaters and VOD on December 12, 2014. The film received negative reviews.

Cast
 Wes Bentley as Bill Scanlon
 Haley Bennett as Ruby
 Vinessa Shaw as Susan Scanlon
 Jason Isaacs as Frank McTiernan
 Keith Carradine as Charles
 Sam Trammell as Lee
 W. Earl Brown
 Jeremiah Bitsui

Reception 
The film received generally negative reviews. The review aggregator website Rotten Tomatoes reported that 36% of critics have given the film a positive review based on 14 reviews. Robert Abele wrote in the Los Angeles Times that "the basic story’s narrative and psychological simplicity ... becomes an increasing burden." Stephen Holden wrote in The New York Times "After the Fall belongs to a type of movie that is too lazy to connect the dots and fill in the blanks between its supposedly teachable moments." However, Stephen Dalton, writing in The Hollywood Reporter, says that film, "has much to recommend, including gorgeous New Mexico landscapes, sumptuous digital cinematography and -- as we might expect from Klein -- virtuoso editing"

References

External links
 

2014 films
2014 drama films
2014 directorial debut films
2010s English-language films
American drama films
Films scored by Marc Streitenfeld
2010s American films